Roman Catholic Diocese of Caceres may refer to the following Catholic jurisdictions :

 Diocese of Coria-Caceres, in Spain
 the former Diocese of Caceres, in the Philippines (now an Archdiocese)